Plain Jane is the fifth studio album by singer/songwriter Chantal Kreviazuk. The album was released on October 13, 2009, in Canada, and was Kreviazuk's first release through MapleMusic Recordings.

Background
Named after the track "Plain Jane", the title reflects Kreviazuk's feelings about living a double life. Splitting time between her native Canada and the United States, Kreviazuk lives a mostly anonymous life in California primarily as a working mother, while she leads a more public life in Canada as an established and recognizable singer songwriter.

The song "5000 Days" is considered by Kreviazuk to be a continuation of her 1999 Colour Moving and Still track "Until We Die".

Album information

Plain Jane features a guest appearance by jazz musician Chris Botti on the title track, performing on the trumpet. Kreviazuk previously made a guest appearance on Botti's 2003 album A Thousand Kisses Deep, providing vocals for the track "The Look of Love".

The closing track, "Na Miso", contains lyrics in an African language(Swahili) about connecting with loved ones. The song was written by and features vocals from Kreviazuk and Bibiane Mpoyo, a nanny of the family.

Two bonus tracks were available through the iTunes Store. "Backfires" can be purchased with the iTunes version of the album, while "Seclusion" was available only through the pre-order of the album.

Promotion
"Invincible" was used in a commercial for Garnier Nutrisse, for which Kreviazuk is the spokesmodel. It was released in Canada and peaked at #60 on the Canadian Hot 100.

On July 9, 2009, as partnership with Garnier Nutrisse Cream, Garnier Canada's website offered a free exclusive download of "Ordinary People" along with the chance to win tickets to one of Kreviazuk's upcoming shows.

On July 15, 2009, a short video clip was posted on YouTube and MySpace of Kreviazuk recording "Today" in the studio.

"Today" was featured in the movie Blue Crush 2.

Track listing

iTunes bonus tracks
 "Backfires" – 3:19
 "Seclusion" – 3:05 (Available with preorder only)

Singles
"Invincible"
"Half of Me"
"The Way"

Personnel
 Chantal Kreviazuk - piano, vocals, keyboards, synth bass
 Randy Cooke - drums, percussion
 Jon Button - bass guitar
 Lenny Solomon - violin
 Sandy Baron - violin
 Eric Paetkau - viola
 Kevin Fox - cello
 David Schwartz - stand-up bass on "Plain Jane"
 Chris Botti - horns on "Plain Jane"
 Raine Maida - acoustic guitar on "Say the Word"
 Bibiane Mpoyo - additional vocals on "Na Miso"
 Sonia Lee - violin on "Na Miso"

Production
 Producer - Raine Maida
 Engineer - Raine Maida
 Assistant engineer - Dusty Schaller
 Digital editors - Raine Maida, Dusty Schaller
 Mixing - Raine Maida, Andrew Scheps
 Mastering - Bob Boyd
 String arrangements - Kevin Fox
 Strings engineer - Samuel Ibbett
 Graphic design - John Rummen
 Photography - Raphael Mazzucco

References

External links
Official site
mySpace
Facebook
Twitter
Collecting Kreviazuk (Fan site)

Chantal Kreviazuk albums
2009 albums
Albums produced by Raine Maida